167th meridian may refer to:

167th meridian east, a line of longitude east of the Greenwich Meridian
167th meridian west, a line of longitude west of the Greenwich Meridian